Imperial Cathedral may refer to:

 Imperial Cathedrals, a cathedral linked to the German emperors

In Germany:
Aachen Cathedral, Aachen
Bamberg Cathedral, Bamberg
Frankfurt Cathedral, Frankfurt
Speyer Cathedral, Speyer
Mainz Cathedral, Mainz

In Russia:
Feodorovsky Imperial Cathedral, Pushkin, Pushkinsky District
Smolny Cathedral, Saint Petersburg